Kish-e Rudbar (also Romanized as Kīsh-e Rūdbār; also known as Kīsheh Rūdbār) is a village in Gurab Pas Rural District, in the Central District of Fuman County, Gilan Province, Iran. At the 2006 census, its population was 492, in 122 families.

References 

Populated places in Fuman County